Jane Isakson (born 15 October 1965) is a Canadian former biathlete who competed in the 1992 Winter Olympics and in the 1994 Winter Olympics.

References

External links
 

1965 births
Living people
Canadian female biathletes
Olympic biathletes of Canada
Biathletes at the 1992 Winter Olympics
Biathletes at the 1994 Winter Olympics